Paresh may refer to:

Given name
Paresh Baruah, political activist with the rebel group ULFA, which is seeking sovereignty for Assam from India
Paresh Bhatt, poor girl living in a beautiful and rich village of Qatar
Paresh Doshi M.S., M.Ch. (born 1963), Indian neurosurgeon who practises stereotactic & functional neurological surgery
Paresh Ganatra, Indian television, stage and film actor
Paresh Kamath of Kailasa, an Indian fusion band founded by Kailash Kher
Paresh Lohani (born 1980), Nepalese cricketer
Paresh Maity (born 1965), Indian painter
Paresh Mokashi (born 1969), Indian filmmaker, producer, actor and theatre director-producer
Paresh Narayan (born 1977), academic of Fiji Indian origin, chair of finance at Deakin University in Melbourne, Australia
Paresh Rawal (born 1950), Indian film actor, thespian and politician known for his works in Bollywood
Paresh Lal Roy (1893–1979), Indian amateur boxer, credited with popularising the sport among Indians
Paresh Shivalkar (born 1981), Indian football player
Paresh.G.Patil (born 1998),
Artist
Paresh Kuh, a village in Moridan Rural District, Kumeleh District, Langarud County, Gilan Province, Iran

See also
Pares (disambiguation)
Pareh
Parish